Hope Su Tseng-chang (born 28 July 1947) is a Taiwanese politician who served as premier of the Republic of China (Taiwan)  from 2006 to 2007 and again from 2019 to 2023. He was the chairman of the Democratic Progressive Party in 2005 and from 2012 to 2014. Su served as Chief of Staff to President Chen Shui-bian in 2004. He is currently the longest-serving Democratic Progressive premier in history.

Su actively campaigned for the DPP presidential nomination in 2008, but finished second to Frank Hsieh. Su eventually teamed with Hsieh as the vice presidential nominee; the DPP lost to the Kuomintang ticket of Ma Ying-jeou and Vincent Siew. Su ran for Taipei City Mayor in November 2010, but lost to the incumbent Hau Lung-pin by a 12-point margin. Su campaigned for the 2012 presidential candidacy of the DPP in 2011, but lost to Tsai Ing-wen by a very narrow margin. Following the loss of Tsai to Ma Ying-jeou, Su was elected to succeed Tsai as DPP chairman in 2012.

During the Chen administration, Su, along with politicians Annette Lu, Frank Hsieh and Yu Shyi-kun, are collectively known as the "Big Four of the Democratic Progressive Party". Su is nicknamed the "Lightbulb" or "E Ball" and "Go Go Go" (衝衝衝) by the Taiwanese media and DPP voters, a nickname he earned in the 1980s for his charismatic approach to campaigning during election season, in addition to being an affectionate reference to the balding Su.

Personal background
Su was born at Ministry of Health and Welfare Pingtung Hospital in Pingtung, Taiwan on 28 July 1947. He studied at the National Taiwan University. He was a practicing lawyer from 1973 to 1983 and became a defense lawyer in the Kaohsiung Incident trials. In September 1986, Su and seventeen others founded the Democratic Progressive Party.

He was previously the magistrate of Pingtung County (1989–1993) and magistrate of Taipei County (1997–2004). His first election as the Taipei magistrate was aided by a split between the New Party, the Kuomintang, and independent candidate Lin Chih-chia. He won the election in dramatic fashion partly due to the appearance of the terminally ill Lu Hsiu-yi, who kneeled on stage in support of Su on the eve of the election. Su's subsequent reelection occurred by a wide margin despite the ability of the Pan-Blue Coalition to present a united candidate, Wang Chien-shien. He was Secretary-General (Chief of Staff) to the Office of the President of the Republic of China under President Chen Shui-bian (2004–2005). After President Chen resigned as DPP chairman following the 2004 legislative elections, he was elected the 10th-term DPP chairman. Following DPP losses in the 2005 municipal elections on December 3, Su announced that he would, pursuant to a pre-election promise, resign from the chairmanship.

Su is married to Chan Hsiu-ling (詹秀齡) with whom he has three daughters, one of which is Su Chiao-hui.

First premiership: 2006–2007
Su was announced as the new premier on January 19, 2006, and took his oath of office, along with his cabinet, on January 25, 2006. Soon after, Su promised to step down if the people's welfare (referring to crime and other civil problems) did not improve within six months. Su faced calls for his resignation after the Rebar Chinese Bank run, but refused to leave his post at the time.

Su was a contender for the DPP nomination in the 2008 presidential election. He formally announced his candidacy on Feb. 25. In the DPP primary vote on May 6, 2007, Su received 46,994 votes, coming in second to former Premier Frank Hsieh.  Conceding defeat in the primary, Su announced that he had withdrawn from the race.

On May 12, 2007, Su submitted his letter of resignation to President Chen Shui-bian, ending his tenure on May 21. With the resignation of Su and with ten months left in Chen's presidency, that would mean Chen's eight years as president will have seen at least six Premiers (with Chang Chun-Hsiung serving two separate tenures). Su also stated that he previously submitted resignations numerous times over his sixteen-month tenure, but all were rejected by President Chen.

First cabinet

2008 presidential campaign 
Su ran for vice president alongside Frank Hsieh, who was the DPP Nomination. Together, Su and Hsieh ran against Ma and Siew. On March 22, they lost in a landslide to Ma and Siew's 7,659,014 (58.45%) votes with their 5,444,949 (41.55%) votes.

2010 Taipei mayoral race 
Although Su had been considered a strong candidate to helm the newly created New Taipei City, because he had previously served the area as Taipei County Magistrate, he instead ran for the mayoralty of Taipei City. Su vowed that should he win, he would serve out the entire term (through 2014) effectively ending any talks of a presidential run in 2012. Su eventually lost the race to the incumbent mayor Hau Lung-pin.

2012 campaigns 
Su declared his candidacy for the 2012 presidential candidacy, but lost a DPP party primary held in April 2011 to Tsai Ing-wen and Hsu Hsin-liang, by a margin of 1.35 percent. He was subsequently elected DPP chairman in May 2012, and was succeeded by Tsai in 2014, after dropping out of the chairmanship election in the wake of the Sunflower Student Movement.

2018 New Taipei mayoral race 

Total voters: 3,264,128; Valid votes: 2,038,822; Voter turnout: 62.46%.

Second premiership: 2019–2023
Su was appointed to the premiership on January 14, 2019, by President Tsai Ing-wen. He succeeded William Lai, who had resigned in response to the Democratic Progressive Party's poor performance in the 2018 Taiwanese local elections. Aged 71, when he returned to the premiership, Su became one of the oldest to hold the office. Soon after Su assumed office, approval ratings for Tsai's presidential administration rose. Su and his second cabinet resigned en masse following the 2020 Taiwanese legislative election, as stipulated in the constitution, but Tsai, who won reelection to the presidency, asked him to remain in his post.

Su visited the crash site of the Hualien train derailment.

On January 19, 2023, Su announced his resignation as Premier as part of a reshuffle following the DPP's heavy defeat in the 2022 Taiwanese local elections. On January 30, Su and his cabinet resigned en masse again. He was replaced by former Vice-President Chen Chien-jen the following day, on January 31.

Second cabinet

See also
 Politics of the Republic of China

References

External links

 
 Premier biography timeline at the Government Information Office, Republic of China (Taiwan)

1947 births
Living people
Magistrates of Pingtung County
Democratic Progressive Party chairpersons
National Taiwan University alumni
Premiers of the Republic of China on Taiwan
Taiwan independence activists
Magistrates of Taipei County
Recipients of the Order of Brilliant Star
Taiwanese political party founders
Taiwanese people of Hoklo descent
21st-century Taiwanese politicians
20th-century Taiwanese politicians